The 1993 Meghalaya Legislative Assembly election was held on 19 February 1993.

Following the election a coalition government called the Meghalaya United Front was formed between the Indian National Congress and a split from the Hill State People's Democratic Party, the All Party Hill Leaders Conference (Armison Marak Group) and several independents. S. C. Marak was elected as Chief Minister.

Results

Elected Members

References

Meghalaya
State Assembly elections in Meghalaya